Vladimír Hrůza (born 6 February 1960) is a Czech former cyclist. He competed in the team time trial at the 1988 Summer Olympics.

References

External links
 

1960 births
Living people
Czech male cyclists
Olympic cyclists of Czechoslovakia
Cyclists at the 1988 Summer Olympics
Sportspeople from Jihlava